Winfall is a town in Perquimans County, North Carolina, United States. The population was 554 at the 2020 census. It is part of the Elizabeth City, North Carolina Micropolitan Statistical Area.

History
The Winfall Historic District was listed on the National Register of Historic Places in 2003.

Geography
Winfall is located at  (36.214551, -76.456758).

Winfall (along with Hertford) is considered to be on the southwesternmost fringe of the Hampton Roads Metropolitan Area, and many local residents commute frequently to and from the Seven Cities region for work, shopping, and leisure.

It is located strategically upon the Perquimans River.

Demographics

2020 census

As of the 2020 United States census, there were 555 people, 322 households, and 203 families residing in the town.

2000 census
As of the census of 2000, there were 554 people, 234 households, and 153 families residing in the town. The population density was 259.0 people per square mile (100.0/km). There were 276 housing units at an average density of 129.0 per square mile (49.8/km). The racial makeup of the town was 61.73% White, 37.73% African American, and 0.54% from two or more races. Hispanic or Latino of any race were 0.54% of the population.

There were 234 households, out of which 25.6% had children under the age of 18 living with them, 50.0% were married couples living together, 11.1% had a female householder with no husband present, and 34.2% were non-families. 30.3% of all households were made up of individuals, and 17.1% had someone living alone who was 65 years of age or older. The average household size was 2.37 and the average family size was 2.94.

In the town, the population was spread out, with 22.9% under the age of 18, 7.0% from 18 to 24, 24.7% from 25 to 44, 22.9% from 45 to 64, and 22.4% who were 65 years of age or older. The median age was 42 years. For every 100 females, there were 93.7 males. For every 100 females age 18 and over, there were 88.1 males.

The median income for a household in the town was $27,386, and the median income for a family was $30,417. Males had a median income of $27,083 versus $17,875 for females. The per capita income for the town was $13,587. About 12.6% of families and 17.8% of the population were below the poverty line, including 25.4% of those under age 18 and 18.1% of those age 65 or over.

References

External links
 Town of Winfall, North Carolina

Towns in Perquimans County, North Carolina
Towns in North Carolina
Elizabeth City, North Carolina micropolitan area
1887 establishments in North Carolina
Populated places established in 1887